Eva Widermann (born June 6, 1978) is an illustrator and concept artist whose work appears in role-playing games.

Education
She went to the Scholastic of Graphic & Design, Munich.

Career
Widermann started her graphic design career in 1998 and worked for several years in the advertising industry.  In 2003 she became a freelance illustrator and concept artist, and her work has been published in books, magazines and games for clients such as Wizards of the Coast, Disney, and Paizo.

Her Dungeons & Dragons work includes Player's Handbook II (2006), Monster Manual IV (2006), Complete Mage (2006), Cityscape (2006), Complete Scoundrel (2007), Magic Item Compendium (2007), Drow of the Underdark (2007), Monster Manual V (2007), Elder Evils (2007), and the 4th edition Monster Manual (2008).

She also illustrates children's books, and has received positive reviews for Arctic Giants (2011), and The Orphan and the Polar bear (2011).

Widermann lived  with her husband in Cork, Ireland for many years.

References

External links
 Eva Widermann's website
 
 (November 2013) Interview with Eva Widermann - Fantasy artist

1978 births
German artists
German children's book illustrators
Living people
Place of birth missing (living people)
Role-playing game artists